The 2013 IHF Men's Youth World Championship was the 5th edition of the tournament and was held at Hungary from 10 – 23 August 2013.

The Oceania Continent Handball Federation withdrew from the tournament.

Denmark defeated Croatia 32–26 in the final to win the title for the third consecutive time.

Venues

Qualified teams
Africa

Americas

Asia

Europe

 (replaced team from Oceania)

 (host)

Oceania
Oceania gave up their spot, a team from Europe (France) replaced its spot.

Preliminary round
24 teams were drawn into four groups of six teams each. The draw was made in Budaörs on 23 May 2013. The top four teams from each group advanced to the Round of 16. The match schedule was released on June 13.

Group A

Group B

Group C

Group D

Knockout round

Championship

Round of 16

Quarterfinals

Semifinals

Third place game

Final

5–8th place playoff

5–8th place semifinals

Seventh place game

Fifth place game

9–16th place playoff

9–16th quarterfinals

9–12th semifinals

Eleventh place game

Ninth place game

13–16th place playoff

13–16th place semifinals

15th place game

13th place game

President's Cup

17–20th place playoff

17–20th place semifinals

17th place game

19th place game

21–24th place playoff

21st–24th place semifinals

21rd place game

23st place game

Final standings

Awards

All-star team
Goalkeeper: 
Left wing: 
Left back: 
Pivot: 
Centre back: 
Right back: 
Right wing:

Other awards
MVP:

References

External links
IHF Site

Men's Youth World Handball Championship
Youth World Handball Championship
International handball competitions hosted by Hungary
World Handball Championship youth and junior tournaments